The B platform or B-body was the name of  Chrysler's midsize rear-wheel drive passenger car platform from 1962 through 1979, and the name of a later, unrelated front-wheel drive platform used by the Eagle Premier / Dodge Monaco from 1988 through 1992. 

The 1962-1979 platform underwent significant changes during its lifetime, but all of Chrysler's B-platform cars in a given model year shared the same chassis, with only styling differences between the Dodge and Plymouth models. The cars were otherwise mechanically identical. Similarly, the 1988-1992 Premier and Monaco models differed only by styling and shared the same front-wheel drive B-body platform.

The Plymouth B-body series ultimately comprised four cars with nearly identical outward appearances (differing only in trim package, drive train and accessories). These were the Belvedere, Satellite, GTX and Road Runner. The Superbird was a Road Runner with an extended nose cone and front fenders borrowed from the Dodge Charger Daytona, and a high-mounted rear wing. The Superbird's unique styling was a result of homologation requirements for using the same aerodynamic nose and rear wing when racing the car in the NASCAR series of the time.

There was more diversity in the outward appearance of the Dodge B-body series. The Dodge models based on the B-body were the Coronet, Super Bee and the Charger. The Charger Daytona was a Charger with an extended nose and high-mounted rear wing, offered for the same reasons as the Superbird.

1962–1979
Cars using the rear-wheel-drive B platform include:
 1962 Dodge Dart
 1962–1964 Dodge Polara
 1962–1964 Plymouth Fury
 1962–1964 Plymouth Savoy
 1962–1970 Plymouth Belvedere
 1963–1964 Dodge 220 (Canadian)
 1963–1964 Dodge 330
 1963–1964 Dodge 440
 1965–1974 Plymouth Satellite
 1965–1976 Dodge Coronet
 1966–1978 Dodge Charger
 1967–1971 Plymouth GTX
 1968–1975 Plymouth Road Runner
 1975–1978 Plymouth Fury
 1975–1979 Chrysler Cordoba
 1977–1978 Dodge Monaco
 1978–1979 Dodge Magnum
 1979 Chrysler 300

Five different wheelbases were available:
 116 in
 1962 Dodge Dart
 1962–1964 Dodge Polara
 1962–1966 Plymouth wagons
 1962–1970 Plymouths (except wagons)
 1963–1964 Dodge 220/330/440
 115 in
 1971–1979 2-door models
 1975–1979 Chrysler Cordoba
 117 in
 1965–1970 Dodges 
 1967–1974 Plymouth wagons
 1971–1974 Plymouth 4 doors
 117.5 in
 1975–1978 Plymouth and Dodge 4 doors and wagons
 118 in
 1971–1974 Dodge

1988–1992
From 1988 to 1992, the B-body name was used again for the midsize front-wheel-drive Eagle Premier sedan, which was originally designed by and was slated to be built by American Motors with Renault until Chrysler's buyout of that company in March 1987. The Premier was later joined by the similar Dodge Monaco for 1990.

Models
 1988–1992 Eagle Premier
 1990–1992 Dodge Monaco

See also
 Chrysler platforms

External links
For B Bodies Only Mopar Forum
Dodge Charger
Plymouth Road Runner
Plymouth Superbird
1969 Roadrunner Forum
B-bodies at Lee Herman's Mopar Page (three pages).

B